The American Journal of Medicine is a peer-reviewed medical journal and the official journal of the Alliance for Academic Internal Medicine. It was established in 1946.  The journal is published monthly by Elsevier. It is also known as "the green journal". Elsevier's former sister company Cahners Publishing acquired The American Journal of Medicine's publisher Technical Publishing in 1986.

Joseph S. Alpert (University of Arizona College of Medicine) became editor-in-chief of the journal in 2004. At that time, the editorial office moved to Tucson, Arizona.

Abstracting and indexing 
The journal is abstracted and indexed in:

 BIOSIS Previews
 CINAHL
 Chemical Abstracts
 Current Contents/Clinical Medicine
 Current Contents/Life Sciences
EMBASE
 Global Health
 Index Medicus/MEDLINE/PubMed
 Science Citation Index
 Scopus

References

External links 
 
 Alliance for Academic Internal Medicine

Publications established in 1946
General medical journals
Elsevier academic journals
Monthly journals
English-language journals
Academic journals associated with learned and professional societies of the United States
Hybrid open access journals